The 1998 Royal Rumble was the 11th annual Royal Rumble professional wrestling pay-per-view (PPV) event produced by the World Wrestling Federation (WWF; WWE as of 2002). It took place on January 18, 1998, at the San Jose Arena in San Jose, California. Six matches were contested on the event's card. As has been customary since 1993, the Royal Rumble match winner received a world championship match at that year's WrestleMania. For the 1998 event, the winner received a match for the WWF Championship at WrestleMania XIV.

The main event was a casket match between Shawn Michaels and The Undertaker for the WWF Championship, which Michaels won to retain the title. The main match on the undercard was the 1998 Royal Rumble match, which Stone Cold Steve Austin won by lastly eliminating The Rock, thus becoming the third person to win two Royal Rumble matches, and back-to-back, after Hulk Hogan and Shawn Michaels. Additionally, The Legion Of Doom (Hawk and Animal) defeated The New Age Outlaws ("Road Dogg" Jesse James and "Badd Ass" Billy Gunn) by disqualification therefore, not winning the WWF Tag Team Championship, and The Rock defeated Ken Shamrock to retain the WWF Intercontinental Championship.

Production

Background
The Royal Rumble is an annual gimmick pay-per-view (PPV), produced every January by the World Wrestling Federation (WWF, now WWE) since 1988. It is one of the promotion's original four pay-per-views, along with WrestleMania, SummerSlam, and Survivor Series, which were dubbed the "Big Four", and was considered one of the "Big Five" PPVs, along with King of the Ring. It is named after the Royal Rumble match, a modified battle royal in which the participants enter at timed intervals instead of all beginning in the ring at the same time. The match generally features 30 wrestlers and the winner traditionally earns a world championship match at that year's WrestleMania. For 1998, the winner earned a match for the WWF Championship at WrestleMania XIV. The 1998 event was the 11th event in the Royal Rumble chronology and was scheduled to be held on January 18, 1998, at the San Jose Arena in San Jose, California.

Storylines 
The card consisted of six matches. The matches resulted from scripted storylines, where wrestlers portrayed heroes, villains, or less distinguishable characters to build tension and culminated in a wrestling match or series of matches. Results were predetermined by WWF's writers, with storylines produced on their weekly television show, Raw.

In the weeks leading up to the pay-per-view, Ken Shamrock had been facing various members of the Nation of Domination ahead of his booked match against Intercontinental Champion Rocky Maivia (The Rock), defeating Kama Mustafa and Faarooq with his ankle lock despite interference from other Nation members. The Raw is War before the Rumble saw Shamrock team up with Mark Henry against Maivia and D'Lo Brown, but just as Shamrock looked set to lock his submission on The Rock, Henry turned on him, joining the Nation in giving him a post-match beat down.

After winning their first tag team title, the New Age Outlaws further humiliated the erstwhile champions, the Legion of Doom, by shaving one of Hawk's mohawks and, with the help of D-Generation X, powerbombed Animal through the announcer's table, damaging his back. Although he was advised not to compete by doctors, Animal rested through the first few weeks of the year while the Outlaws ran roughshod through the tag division before this pay-per-view.

The buildup to the Royal Rumble match itself focused almost entirely on Stone Cold Steve Austin. He declared that before the match he would be living by the motto "Do unto others, before they do unto me" interfering in matches regularly on Raw is War, or appearing just as matches finished, delivering the stunner to anyone in sight as well leaving other wrestlers back stage buried under tables and chairs. In the final segment of the Raw preceding the event, all competitors of the Royal Rumble were in the ring, waiting to draw their number of entry when Austin ran in through the crowd and began to throw punches all over the ring, sparking a brawl between the various wrestlers feuding in the ring, and kicking the number generator out of the ring.

The main event for the WWF Championship was a rematch between champion Shawn Michaels and challenger The Undertaker. The feud had begun after SummerSlam the previous August after Michaels, who was the special referee in the match between then-champion Undertaker and Bret Hart, hit Undertaker with a chair meant for Hart and counted the pin to cost Undertaker the championship. The first match between the two came at Ground Zero: In Your House the following month, a match that ended in a no contest due to outside interference from Michaels' D-Generation X cohorts, Triple H and Chyna. Michaels and Undertaker resumed the feud at Badd Blood in October 1997 in the first Hell in a Cell match which ended with the debut of Undertaker's (kayfabe) brother, Kane, giving Michaels the unfair win by delivering a tombstone piledriver on Undertaker, allowing the almost beaten Michaels to steal the match. To mock his opponent, Triple H and Chyna brought a casket to the ring only for Michaels to appear from inside and spray paint it in D-Generation X slogans. The following week, while Michaels was delivering a promo, the same casket appeared again but this time Undertaker appeared from inside, grabbing the champion by the throat and dragging him into the coffin. Undertaker made his full presence known the following week, interrupting an interview in which Michaels was claiming to introduce the newest DX member: Kane. Undertaker told his opponent to leave his family out of the feud, before attacking the stable and being outnumbered. Kane made a surprise appearance and helped Undertaker, fighting DX up to the ramp before turning and reaching his hand out in an Undertaker-like salute which his brother returned.

Event
The opening match began with Goldust attacking Vader as he entered the ring. Vader soon recovered and threw Goldust into the turnbuckle before he eventually fell out of the ring where Vader also shoved Luna Vachon to the ground. After a suplex and a big splash, Goldust was dragged to the corner so Vader could attempt his Vader Bomb, but a low blow stopped him. Vader then attempted the move for the second time, only to have Luna jump on his back. Vader hit the move anyway, and scored the pin.

With Sunny as the special guest referee, a six-man tag match of lucha libre midget wrestling took place. The face team took most of the early advantage, tagging frequently while the heel team were regularly thrown under the bottom rope and replaced with a fresh member. Max Mini used Sunny to help him dropkick  Battalion, Tarantula and then El Torito in order and then delivered a top rope hurricarana to Torito, and winning the match with a backslide pin.

The Intercontinental Championship bout began with an exchange of punches and a few kicks until Ken Shamrock mistimed a hurricarana, allowing Rocky Maivia to slam him down. After being kicked to the corner, Shamrock replied with a crossbody that only gained him a two-count, as did a fisherman suplex pin. Rock took control by reversing an Irish whip into a DDT and then putting the challenger in a headlock. His next attempt at a DDT was reversed, however, into a powerslam prompting Nation members to storm the ring. With the referee distracted after The Rock's Nation of Domination teammate D'Lo Brown's foot gets stuck with the ropes, The Rock used a brass knuckles to hit Shamrock and then disposed of the knuckleduster inside Shamrock's trunks. By the time the referee looked back to the ring, he could only make a two count and Shamrock pulled off a belly to belly suplex slam, winning the match. However, as Shamrock celebrated, Rock appealed to Mike Chioda who, upon discovering the foreign object, reversed the decision and took the belt from a bemused Shamrock. Then, Chioda gave it back to The Rock, making him the winner via disqualification. A furious Shamrock attacked the referee for stripping him of the title.

In the tag team match, New Age Outlaws prematurely began by attacking Legion of Doom before the bell rang but the Legion quickly turned the match in their favor, chasing the Outlaws up the ramp as the champions tried to lose by count out. Still holding control, the Legion took turns on Road Dogg who eventually handcuffed Hawk to the corner outside the ring. Regardless, Animal successfully dominated both Road Dogg and Billy Gunn, powerslamming Gunn into a pin that was broken by a chair shot. The disqualification gave the victory to LOD while the New Age Outlaws retained the belts, double teaming Animal until Hawk broke free from the cuffs to save his partner.

The Royal Rumble began with Mick Foley's persona Cactus Jack as #1, bringing trash cans to the ring. The second contestant was Terry Funk's alter-ego Chainsaw Charlie who ran to the ring wielding his chainsaw before Cactus hit him with a chair and the two engaged in a hardcore battle briefly interrupted by Tom Brandi who they both eliminated over the top rope. As The Rock entered, he was met with a trash can over the head, being bundled out of the ring under the bottom rope briefly. As the ring filled up Cactus Jack went to clothesline Charlie over the top rope but inadvertently threw himself over and eliminated himself. Owen Hart came out #9 but before he was able to enter the ring, NWA North American Champion Jeff Jarrett and ally Jim Cornette attacked him. Soon after, at #16, Mick Foley returned to the ring in his Mankind gimmick, returning the favour by eliminating Chainsaw Charlie while Ken Shamrock and The Rock resumed their feud from earlier. Jarrett officially came out at #18 and was soon joined in the ring by Owen Hart, who ran out from the back and eliminated Jarrett. Hart himself was soon distracted by the non-competing Triple H, who hit him with a crutch as Chyna yanked him out. When the clock counted down to #22, no contestant appeared with Jerry Lawler on commentary attributing the number to Stone Cold Steve Austin, who had reportedly been taken out backstage by Ken Shamrock. By #23, the Nation of Domination had four members (Rock, D'Lo Brown, Mark Henry and Kama Mustafa) in the ring although they seldom worked together. All fighting in the ring ceased when Austin's music played for #24 but, after a lengthy wait, Stone Cold appeared from behind and tossed out Marc Mero and 8-Ball. Savio Vega, who entered #26, was accompanied by the rest of Los Boricuas who went straight after Austin. Faarooq completed the Nation stable in the ring but went straight after teammate The Rock before Foley's third appearance as Dude Love. Soon only four men remained (Rock, Austin, Dude Love and Faarooq) and Austin and Dude Love, former tag team partners, teamed up against the Nation members, until Austin turned on Dude, allowing Faarooq to clothesline him out of the match. When Faarooq then turned to Austin, Rock tossed his teammate out of the ring leaving the former Intercontinental Champion against the current champion. The Rock survived almost being thrown out only to be stunnered and tossed out again.

The main event began with The Undertaker mostly controlling Shawn Michaels. After walking on the top rope, Undertaker rolled Michaels into the casket but Michaels' hand grabbing the ring apron stopped it from being shut. As Undertaker went to shut the casket, Michaels threw it open and dazed his opponent by throwing powder into his eyes, leaving him stunned. Despite a throat shot, Undertaker began to lose his dominance of the match as things moved outside of the ring, with Michaels delivering a piledriver on top of the steel steps, before fellow degenerate, Triple H, hit him with a crutch. Michaels, too, failed to close the coffin's lid on Undertaker, forcing the fight back into the ring where Shawn tried to submit his opponent, following with a high-flying elbow drop and Sweet Chin Music. So sure of the win, with Undertaker lying in the casket, Michaels chose instead to taunt Undertaker, giving a crotch-chop which Undertaker seized on, leading to a brief fight in the ring but going back into the casket when Undertaker missed a flying clothesline and his momentum caused him to tumble inside. Michaels climbed to the top rope and delivered an elbow drop into the casket and the two fought inside a closed coffin. After eventually climbing out, both made it back to the ring where Undertaker gave Shawn a chokeslam. He then dragged the champion to the ring apron and hit a jumping tombstone piledriver, depositing Michaels into the casket. Before Undertaker could close it, the New Age Outlaws and Los Boricuas ran in and collectively pummeled Undertaker until the lights went out in the arena. Kane's music played and the Big Red Monster single-handedly took out everyone in the ring. In the meantime Chyna and Triple H helped a visibly hurt Shawn Michaels out of the casket. Kane suddenly turned on Undertaker, punching him and chokeslamming him into the casket. Triple H and Chyna shut it, thus ending the match and allowing Michaels to retain his title.

Kane was not done, however, as Paul Bearer came to ringside and the two padlocked Undertaker inside the casket and rolled it to the top of the entrance ramp where Kane chopped holes in the casket with an axe, doused it with gasoline and set it on fire. After the show went off the air, with the casket still burning, Kane and Bearer left the arena while various emergency officials extinguished the fire and Commissioner Slaughter and others tried to break open the casket to free Undertaker. However, when the casket was opened, no one was inside. Undertaker's voice then was heard to say "Kane, until our paths cross again, I shall never rest in peace!"

Reception
In 2010, Jack Bramma of 411Mania gave the event a rating of 7.0 [Good], stating, "Worth a look for historical purposes if nothing else. Rocky was clearly on his way to being a star, Austin wasn't quite yet the biggest name in the industry but was close, and Michaels' (sort of) career-ending injury. And oh yeah four quality matches."

In 2019, Thomas Hall of Wrestling Rumors gave the event a rating of D, stating, "Good main event aside, this was a REALLY dull show overall. 1998 would wind up being an awesome year, but this wasn’t the best start to it in the world. We saw a lot of the relics of the bad times here, but Austin was coming and there was absolutely nothing WCW could do to stop him. This wasn’t a good show at all, but it was a necessary evil to get us to the glory days."

In 2022, John Canton of TJRWrestling gave the event a rating of 6/10, stating, "It was another average Royal Rumble event that was lacking in terms of great matches aside from the main event. When it comes to that Undertaker/Shawn match, while it was very good, it’s not their most famous match or their best match. The other undercard matches were poor, so that hurt the card quite a bit. In addition to that, the Royal Rumble match was probably the most predictable Rumble ever with Steve Austin winning. Aside from a few fun moments, it wasn’t very interesting at all. The crowd was engaged most of the night, so that’s a positive and I also felt like they built up the top WrestleMania matches pretty well. At least Mike Tyson botching his interview and saying “Cold Stone” made me laugh."

Aftermath
By winning the Royal Rumble match, "Stone Cold" Steve Austin won the right to face Shawn Michaels for the WWF Championship at WrestleMania XIV. Mike Tyson's presence in the director's box was revealed the following night to be because he was taking the role of special guest referee for the event. Following an altercation with Austin, however, he was changed to special enforcer and soon allied with D-Generation X. At WrestleMania, though, Tyson showed his true colors and stepped in when the referee was knocked down making the three-count for Austin which many see as the official genesis for the "Attitude Era" and WWF's resurging dominance over chief rivals World Championship Wrestling (WCW).

During his match with The Undertaker, Shawn Michaels suffered a severe back injury when he took a back body drop off of the casket, landing on his tailbone on the casket's outer mid-section. He herniated two discs in his back and crushed a third, and the injury forced him to retire from wrestling after WrestleMania. As it transpired, during a one-off match with Triple H at SummerSlam 2002, he realized his back no longer hampered him and made a full-time return to wrestling. His back injury kept him out of all wrestling until the main event at WrestleMania, despite being billed on the card for the next PPV, No Way Out of Texas. His last-minute replacement was Savio Vega, who appeared in the main event eight-man tag team match which saw a number of high-profile feuds converge on the road to WrestleMania.

The New Age Outlaws would go on to take part in the eight-man main event at No Way Out of Texas, sparring opposite Cactus Jack and Chainsaw Charlie ahead of their WrestleMania title match. Their alliance with Triple H in this match saw them join the newly formed DX Army the day after WrestleMania. Legion of Doom went on to suffer a series of losses, ending in another loss against the Outlaws on February 23 after which they had an in-ring brawl and announced the dissolution of their team. They reappeared in a modified form as LOD 2000 in the opening WrestleMania match with Sunny as their valet.

Rocky Maivia's feud with Ken Shamrock spilled out into a ten-man tag match between the Nation of Domination and Shamrock's team, teaming with Ahmed Johnson and the Disciples of Apocalypse. Shamrock won the match by pinning Rock and faced him at WrestleMania once again for the Intercontinental title. He originally won the match but would not release his ankle lock; thus, Shamrock was disqualified.

The Undertaker would not return to action until WrestleMania, where he defeated Kane in a singles match. The feud continued with an inferno match at Unforgiven: In Your House in April. Two months later the two entered a storyline where Undertaker was eventually revealed to be in cahoots with his brother, which concluded with Paul Bearer reuniting with Undertaker and turning on Kane which led to the formation of the Ministry of Darkness at the end of 1998. This also marked the last time he would face Michaels in a singles match until the two met at WrestleMania 25; he would wrestle Michaels once more at WrestleMania XXVI where he won a "streak vs. career" match, forcing Michaels to retire from wrestling for good.

Results

Royal Rumble entrances and eliminations
A new entrant came out approximately every 90 seconds.

 – Winner

 Referee Jack Doan was inadvertently kicked by Phineas I. Godwinn during his elimination, resulting in the referee suffering a concussion.

 Triple H and Chyna were not entrants in the Royal Rumble Match; they arrived in the arena during Honky Tonk Man's entry and worked together to eliminate Owen. Owen then ran after both of them to the backstage area.

 Owen was unable to compete in the Rumble for a while as he was beaten up by Jeff Jarrett on the way to the ring; he joined in the Rumble later on after Jarrett's entry, taking his revenge on Jarrett and eliminating him.

 Skull never made it to the ring; he was attacked by Los Boricuas prior to the Royal Rumble match when they mistook him for Stone Cold Steve Austin.

 Mick Foley is the only competitor to enter the same Royal Rumble match 3 times under different personas.

References

External links
Official website
Review of Royal Rumble 1998
Review of Royal Rumble 1998

1998 in California
1998
Professional wrestling in San Jose, California
Events in San Jose, California
1998 WWF pay-per-view events
January 1998 events in the United States